The Casuariiformes  is an order of large flightless birds that has four surviving members: the three species of cassowary, and the only remaining species of emu. They are divided into either a single family, Casuariidae, or more typically two, with the emu splitting off into its own family, Dromaiidae.

All four living members are native to Australia-New Guinea, but some possible extinct taxa occurred in other landmasses.

Systematics and evolution

The emus form a distinct family, characterized by legs adapted for running. The total number of cassowary species described, based on minor differences in casque shape and color variations, formerly reached nine. Now, however, only three species are recognized, and most authorities only acknowledge few subspecies or none at all.

The fossil record of casuariforms is interesting, but not very extensive. Regarding fossil species of Dromaius and Casuarius, see their genus pages. As with all ratites, there are several contested theories concerning their evolution and relationships.

Some Australian fossils initially believed to be from emus were recognized to represent a distinct genus, Emuarius, which had a cassowary-like skull and femur and an emu-like lower leg and foot. In addition, the first fossils of mihirungs were initially believed to be from giant emus, but these birds were completely unrelated.

It has been suggested that the South American genus Diogenornis was a casuariiform bird, instead of a member of the rheas, the current South American lineage of giant ground birds. If this were the case, not only would it extend the fossil range of this lineage to a wider region, but to a broader time span as well, since Diogenornis occurs in the late Paleocene and is among the earliest known ratites. In the late 19th century, a fossil casuariid (Hypselornis) was named from India based on a single toe bone, however it was later shown to belong to a crocodilian.

An especially interesting question regarding this order is whether emus or cassowaries are the more primitive form, if either. Emus are generally assumed to retain more ancestral features, in part because of their more modest coloration, but this does not necessarily have to be the case. The casuariiform fossil record is ambiguous, and the present knowledge of their genome is insufficient for comprehensive analysis. Resolving the cladistic issues will require combination of all these approaches, with at least the additional consideration of plate tectonics.

Taxonomy
Casuariiformes (Sclater, 1880) Forbes 1884
?†Diogenornis - Alvarenga, 1983 (Paleocene of Brazil)
†Diogenornis fragilis Alvarenga, 1983
Casuariidae Kaup, 1847 [Casuariinae Reichenbach, 1849] (emus and cassowaries)
†Emuarius Boles, 1992 (emuwaries) (Late Oligocene – Late Miocene)
†E. gidju (Patterson & Rich 1987) Boles, 1992 [Dromaius gidju Patterson & Rich 1987]
†E. guljaruba Boles, 2001
Casuarius (Linnaeus 1758) Brisson, 1760 [Cela Oken, 1816; Cela Moehr, 1752 nomen rejectum; Rhea Lacépède, 1800 non Latham, 1790; Chelarga Billberg, 1828; Oxyporus Brookes, 1828 non (Bourdot & Galzin, 1925) Donk, 1933; Thrasys Billberg, 1828; Cassowara Perry, 1811; Hippalectryo Gloger, 1842] (cassowary)
†C. lydekkeri Rothschild, 1911 (Pygmy cassowary)
C. casuarius (Linnaeus, 1758) Brisson, 1760 [Struthio casuarius Linnaeus, 1758; Casuarius casuarius altijugus (Sclater, 1878); Casuarius altijugus Sclater, 1878; ; Casuarius casuarius aruensis (Schlegel, 1866); Casuarius aruensis Schlegel, 1866; Casuarius australis D'Albertis non Wall, 1854; Casuarius casuarius australis; Casuarius casuarius beccarii (Sclater, 1875); Casuarius beccarii Sclater, 1875; Casuarius bicarunculatus Sclater, 1860; Casuarius casuarius bicarunculatus (Sclater, 1860); Casuarius bicarunculatus bicarunculatus; Casuarius bistriatus van Oort, 1907; Casuarius casuarius bistriatus van (Oort, 1907); Casuarius casuarius casuarius (Linnaeus, 1758); Casuarius casuarius chimaera Rothschild, 1904; Casuarius bicarunculatus chimaera (Rothschild, 1904); Casuarius casuarius grandis Rothschild, 1937; Casuarius galeatus Bonnaterre, 1790; Casuarius casuarius hamiltoni Mathews, 1915; Casuarius casuarius intensus Rothschild, 1898; Casuarius bicarunculatus intermedius Rothschild, 1928; Casuarius casuarius intermedius (Rothschild, 1928); Casuarius casuarius johnsonii (Müller, 1866); Casuarius johnsonii Müller, 1866; Casuarius casuarius lateralis Rothschild, 1925; Casuarius casuarius salvadorii (Oustalet, 1878); Casuarius salvadorii Oustalet, 1878; Casuarius casuarius sclaterii (Salvadori, 1878); Casuarius sclaterii Salvadori, 1878; Casuarius casuarius tricarunculatus (Beccari, 1876); Casuarius bicarunculatus tricarunculatus (Beccari, 1876); Casuarius tricarunculatus Beccari, 1876; Casuarius casuarius violicollis Rothschild, 1899; Cassowara eximia Perry, 1811; Hippalectryo indicus Gloger 1842; Hippalectryo casuarius; Casuarius hagenbecki Rothschild, 1904; Casuarius casuarius hagenbecki; Casuarius unappendiculatus hagenbecki (Rothschild, 1904); Casuarius emeu; Casuarius orientalis; Casuarius javanensis] (Southern Cassowary)
C. unappendiculatus Blyth 1860 [Casuarius doggetti Rothschild, 1904; ; Casuarius unappendiculatus doggetti (Rothschild, 1904); Casuarius unappendiculatus mitratus Rothschild, 1904; Casuarius unappendiculatus multicolor Le Souef, 1930; Casuarius unappendiculatus suffusus Rothschild, 1904; Casuarius unappendiculatus rothschildi (Matschie, 1901); Casuarius rothschildi Matschie, 1901; Casuarius unappendiculatus philipi (Rothschild, 1898); Casuarius philipi Rothschild, 1898; Casuarius unappendiculatus unappendiculatus; Casuarius unappendiculatus occipitalis (Salvadori, 1878); Casuarius occipitalis Salvadori, 1878; Casuarius unappendiculatus rufotinctus Rothschild, 1900; Casuarius unappendiculatus aurentiacus Rothschild, 1899; Casuarius kaupi  Rosenberg, 1861; Casuarius laglaizei Oustalet, 1893] (Northern Cassowary)
C. bennetti Gould, 1857 [Casuarius westermanni Sclater, 1874; Casuarius papuanus Schlegel, 1871; Casuarius goodfellowi Rothschild, 1914; Casuarius foersteri Rothschild, 1913; Casuarius keysseri Rothschild, 1912; Casuarius jamrachi Rothschild, 1904; Casuarius roseigularis Rothschild, 1905; Casuarius rogersi Rothschild, 1928; Casuarius edwardsi Oustalet, 1878; Casuarius claudii Ogilvie-Grant, 1911; Casuarius picticollis Sclater, 1874; Casuarius loriae Rothschild, 1898; Casuarius maculatus Rothschild, 1900] (Dwarf Cassowary)
C. b. westermanni (Sclater, 1874) [Casuarius westermanni Sclater, 1874; Casuarius bennetti westermanni; Casuarius papuanus Schlegel, 1871; Casuarius bennetti papuanus (Schlegel, 1871); Casuarius goodfellowi Rothschild, 1914; Casuarius bennetti goodfellowi (Rothschild, 1914); Casuarius papuanus goodfellowi (Rothschild, 1914); Casuarius papuanus shawmayeri Rothschild, 1937; Casuarius bennetti shawmayeri (Rothschild, 1937); Casuarius foersteri Rothschild, 1913; Casuarius bennetti foersteri (Rothschild, 1913); Casuarius picticollis hecki Rothschild, 1899; Casuarius bennetti hecki (Rothschild, 1899); Casuarius keysseri Rothschild, 1912; Casuarius bennetti keysseri (Rothschild, 1912); Casuarius jamrachi Rothschild, 1904; Casuarius casuarius jamrachi (Rothschild, 1904); Casuarius unappendiculatus jamrachi (Rothschild, 1904); Casuarius roseigularis Rothschild, 1905; Casuarius bennetti roseigularis (Rothschild, 1905); Casuarius rogersi Rothschild, 1928] (Papuan dwarf cassowary)
C. b. bennetti Gould, 1857 [Casuarius edwardsi Oustalet, 1878; Casuarius bennetti edwardsi (Oustalet, 1878); Casuarius westermanni edwardsi (Oustalet, 1878); Casuarius claudii Ogilvie-Grant, 1911; Casuarius bennetti claudii (Ogilvie-Grant, 1911); Casuarius picticollis Sclater, 1874; Casuarius bennetti picticollis (Sclater, 1874); Casuarius loriae Rothschild, 1898; Casuarius bennetti loriae (Rothschild, 1898); Casuarius maculatus Rothschild, 1900; Casuarius bennetti maculatus (Rothschild, 1900)] (Bennett's cassowary)
Dromaiidae Huxley, 1868 [Dramaiinae Gray, 1870; Dramiceiidae Richmond, 1908; Dramaeidae Newton, 1896] (modern emus)
Dromaius Vieillot, 1816 [Tachea Fleming 1822; Emou Griffith & Pidgeon 1829; Peronista Mathews 1912; Metapteryx De Vis, 1892] (emus) (Middle Miocene – Recent)
†D. ocypus Miller, 1963 [Casuarius ocypus (Miller, 1963)]
D. novaehollandiae (Latham, 1790) Vieillot 1816 [Casuarius novae-hollandiae Latham, 1790; †Dromaius gracilipes De Vis, 1892; †Dromaius patricius De Vris, 1888; Metapteryx bifrons De Vis, 1892] (emu)
†D. n. minor Spencer, 1906 [Dromaeus minor (sic) Spencer, 1906; Dromaius novaehollandiae ater Vieillot, 1817; Dromiceius spenceri (sic) Mathews, 1912; Dromaeus bassi Legge, 1907; Dromaius ater Vieillot, 1817 nomen novum; Peronista spenceri (Mathews, 1912)] (King Island/black emu)
†D. n. baudinianus Parker, 1984 [Dromaius baudinianus Parker 1984; Dromaius baudinianus baudinianus; Dromaius parvulus Mathews, 1901; Dromaius peroni Rothschild, 1907; Dromiceius novaehollandiae gunni Mathews, 1922; Peronista peroni (Rothschild 1907) Mathews, 1913] (Kangaroo Island/dwarf emu)
†D. n. diemenensis (Jennings, 1827) Le Souef, 1907 [Casuarius diemenianus Jennings, 1827; Dromaeus diemenensis (Jennings, 1827) Le Souëf, 1907; Peronista diemenianus Mathews, 1927] (Tasmanian emu)
D. n. novaehollandiae (Latham, 1790) [Dromaius novaehollandiae rothschildi Mathews, 1912; Casuarius australis Shaw, 1792; Casuarius novaehollandiae Latham, 1790; Dromaeus irroratus Bartlett, 1859; Dromaius novaehollandiae montanus Campbell, 1939; Dromaius novaehollandiae woodwardi Mathews, 1912; Dromiceius emu Stephens, 1826; Dromiceius major Brookes, 1830; Tachea novaehollandiae; Struthio novaehollandiae] (Australian emu)

Footnotes

References

References

External links

 
Novaeratitae
Taxa named by Philip Sclater
Bird orders
Ratites
Flightless birds
Extant Miocene first appearances
Miocene taxonomic orders
Pliocene taxonomic orders
Pleistocene taxonomic orders
Holocene taxonomic orders